Brûlé Lake (: Burnt Lake) is a lake in southern Labrador (the mainland portion of the province of Newfoundland and Labrador), Canada, overlapping the border with Quebec.

Location

Brûlé Lake is in the unorganized territory of Lac-Jérôme in the Minganie Regional County Municipality.
Brûlé Lake is a widening of the Romaine River, which flows south into the Jacques-Cartier Strait west of Havre-Saint-Pierre. 
At this point the Romaine River defines the border between Quebec and Labrador.
A map of the ecological regions of Quebec shows the lake in the sub-region 7c-T of the east spruce/lichen subdomain.

Name

The Innu call the lake Upuapuhkau Nipi or Upuâpûhkâu Nipi, meaning "lake whose perimeter burned in the past".
It is also called Apuabushkau or Apuabushkash.
In the 19th century it was called Lacs Brûlés, referring to the connected Brûlé, Lavoie and Anderson lakes.
On maps of 1898 and 1907 it is shown as "L. Brulé", then on a map of 1911 as "Burnt Lakes", and in 1924 as "Lac Brulé".
There are ninety lakes called Lac Brûlé, Brûlés or Brûlée in Quebec.

Notes

Sources

Lakes of Côte-Nord
Labrador
Lakes of Newfoundland and Labrador